Souhaila Sami Andrawes Sayeh ( born 28 March 1953 in Beirut) is a former militant and Lebanese member of the Popular Front for the Liberation of Palestine (PFLP). In 1977 she participated in the hijacking of Lufthansa Flight 181 and the murder of pilot Jürgen Schumann. Andrawes was the only one of the four hijackers to survive the GSG 9 storming of the plane in Mogadishu. During the rescue operation, she was shot in the legs and lungs.

Andrawes was sentenced to twenty years imprisonment in Somalia, but was released a year later due to health-related issues, after which she moved to Beirut. In 1991, she moved to Oslo with her husband Palestinian academic and human rights activist Dr. Ahmad Abu Matar, and her daughter until she was tracked down by Norwegian Police Security Service (PST) in 1994 and handed over to Germany in 1995. The arrest was followed by a strong debate on how to deal with foreign terrorists. She was sentenced to 12 years on terrorism charges and was released after three years due to poor health. She was the first woman to be sentenced twice for such a crime. Andrawes has since resided in Oslo, Norway with her husband and their daughter.

References 

1953 births
Living people
People from Beirut
People imprisoned on charges of terrorism
Prisoners and detainees of Somalia
People convicted of murder by Germany
Hijackers
People extradited to Germany
People extradited from Norway
Palestinian emigrants to Norway
Palestinian people imprisoned abroad
Refugees in Norway